Aleksei Vasilyevich Rebko (born 23 April 1986) is a Russian association football coach and a former midfielder. He is an assistant manager with Fakel Voronezh.

Career
He broke the record of youngest players record for Spartak in 2002, previously held by Aleksandr Pavlenko.

He made two appearances in UEFA Champions League 2006–07, but in total just played 13 minutes. On 25 February 2010 FC Dynamo Moscow signed the former FC Moscow midfielder on a free transfer until 2013.

International career
Rebko made his debut for the Russia national football team on 5 September 2009 in a game against Liechtenstein.

Career statistics

Club

International

Statistics accurate as of match played 14 October 2009

References

External links

1986 births
Footballers from Moscow
Living people
Russian footballers
Russia under-21 international footballers
Russia international footballers
FC Spartak Moscow players
FC Rubin Kazan players
FC Moscow players
Association football midfielders
Russian Premier League players
FC Dynamo Moscow players
FC Rostov players
FC Tom Tomsk players
FC Amkar Perm players
FC Luch Vladivostok players
FC Rotor Volgograd players
FC Ararat Moscow players